John McEnroe defeated Arthur Ashe in the final, 6–7, 6–3, 7–5 to win the singles title at the 1978 Colgate-Palmolive Masters.

Jimmy Connors was the defending champion, but lost in the round-robin.

Draw

Finals

Group A
 Standings are determined by: 1. number of wins; 2. number of matches; 3. in two-players-ties, head-to-head records; 4. in three-players-ties, percentage of sets won, or of games won; 5. steering-committee decision.

Group B
 Standings are determined by: 1. number of wins; 2. number of matches; 3. in two-players-ties, head-to-head records; 4. in three-players-ties, percentage of sets won, or of games won; 5. steering-committee decision.

See also
ATP World Tour Finals appearances

References
1978 Masters-Singles

Singles